Then There's You may refer to:

"Then There's You", a song performed by The Wilkinsons, released on Nothing but Love, 1998
"Then There's You", a song by Charlie Puth from Nine Track Mind, 2016
"Then There's You", a song by Day26 from Forever in a Day, 2009
"Then There's You", a song by David James from If I Were You, 2020